The St. Catharines Saints are a Canadian Senior box lacrosse team. The team played in the City of St. Catharines, Ontario, Canada and participate in the OLA Senior B Lacrosse League. They were the 2013 Presidents Cup National Champions and three-time Ontario Lacrosse Association Senior B Champions.

History

In 2013, the Saints won their third consecutive league title in only their third season of existence.  The Saints travelled to Kahnawake to compete for the national championship.  They would finish first place in the round robin with 5 wins and one loss, beating Calgary, Onondaga, Capital Region, and Caughnawaga before losing to Kahnawake in the final round robin game.  St. Kitts beat Calgary 10–8 in the semi-final and avenged their loss to Kahnawake with an 8–5 win to take the Presidents Cup as Canadian Senior B champions.  National Lacrosse League goalie Jake Henhawk and Chris Attwood were named to the tournament's all-star teams, while Henhawk was named the tournament's most valuable player.

The Saints hosted the 2015 Presidents Cup.

Season-by-season results

Presidents Cup results

See also
OLA Senior B Lacrosse League
Presidents Cup (box lacrosse)

References

External links
Saints website

Ontario Lacrosse Association teams
Sport in St. Catharines